Kenneth "Ken" R. Reed (born April 10, 1968) is an American politician, businessman, and pharmacist who served as a member of the West Virginia House of Delegates from the 59th district. He served from 2020 to 2022.

Early life and education 
Born in Weirton, West Virginia, Reed graduated from Brooke High School. He earned a Bachelor of Science degree in pharmacy from West Virginia University.

Career 
From 1992 to 1998, Reed worked as a pharmacy manager for Rite Aid. He has been the CEO of Reed's Pharmacy since 1998. He was also the president of the West Virginia Pharmacists Association. In 2014, Reed was a candidate for West Virginia's 2nd congressional district, placing second in the Republican primary after eventual winner Alex Mooney. He was elected to the West Virginia House of Delegates in 2020.

References 

1968 births
Living people
Republican Party members of the West Virginia House of Delegates
People from Weirton, West Virginia
Pharmacists from West Virginia
West Virginia University alumni